Hyla palliata is a nomen inquirendum or nomen dubium that could refer to some species of Boana, a genus of treefrogs. It was originally given by Edward Drinker Cope in 1863 to a specimen (holotype) collected from an unspecific location in Paraguay. The specimen is now lost and it is not possible to assign this name to any known species.

References

Nomina dubia
Taxa named by Edward Drinker Cope
Amphibians described in 1863
Taxonomy articles created by Polbot
Taxobox binomials not recognized by IUCN